Haplaner is a genus of beetles in the family Carabidae, containing the following species:

 Haplaner australis (Blackburn, 1888)
 Haplaner insulicola Blackburn, 1901
 Haplaner velox (Castelnau, 1867)

References

Harpalinae